Revelations of a Mind Unraveling is Lincoln Durham's third studio album, released on March 25, 2016, on Droog Records. The album is a soundtrack for his exploration of the darkness of his inner psyche. Durham has dealt with anxiety, depression, and OCD all of his life, and rather than taking medication, he has found that his music soothes his issues. The album was written during a period when his issues rose up against him and he wrote the music as ammunition to shoot it down.

Track list

References

2016 albums
Lincoln Durham albums